Robert Alonzo "Bobby" Copp (November 15, 1918 – December 12, 2006) was a Canadian ice hockey defenceman. He played 30 games in the National Hockey League for the Toronto Maple Leafs between 1942 and 1950. The rest of his career, which lasted from 1940 to 1955, was spent in the minor leagues.

Career statistics

Regular season and playoffs

External links

1918 births
2006 deaths
Canadian ice hockey defencemen
Ice hockey people from New Brunswick
Ontario Hockey Association Senior A League (1890–1979) players
Ottawa Senators (QSHL) players
People from Westmorland County, New Brunswick
Toronto Maple Leafs players
Toronto Marlboros players